Paul Chu may refer to:

Paul Ching Wu Chu, physicist known for work on superconductivity, and president of The Hong Kong University of Science and Technology
Paul K. Chu, professor at City University of Hong Kong